Dubianaclia is a genus of moths in the subfamily Arctiinae.

Species
 Dubianaclia amplificata Saalm., 1879-80
 Dubianaclia butleri Mabille, 1884
 Dubianaclia robinsoni Griveaud, 1964
 Dubianaclia quinquimacula Mabille, 1882

Former species
 Dubianaclia contigua Saalmüller, 1884

References

Natural History Museum Lepidoptera generic names catalog

Arctiinae